Tüləkəran or Tyulekiran or Tyulyakeran may refer to:
Aşağı Tüləkəran, Azerbaijan
Yuxarı Tüləkəran, Azerbaijan